The Frauen DFB-Pokal 1998–99 was the 19th season of the cup competition, Germany's second-most important title in women's football. The first round of the competition was held on 16–17 August 1998. In the final which was held in Berlin on 12 June 1999 FFC Frankfurt defeated FCR Duisburg 1–0, thus winning their first cup. As they also won the Bundesliga in the same season, Frankfurt claimed the double, too.

1st round

* Polizei SV Rostock withdrew their team. Turbine Potsdam II thus advanced to the next round.

2nd round

* The women's football section of SG Praunheim had moved to the newly founded FFC Frankfurt on 1 January 1999. Frankfurt took over all qualifications and players from Praunheim.

Quarter-finals

Semi-finals

Final

See also
 Bundesliga 1998–99
 1998–99 DFB-Pokal men's competition

DFB-Pokal Frauen seasons
Pokal
Fra